Palakkuzha is a village in Ernakulam district in the Indian state of Kerala. It is located in the alternate route from Koothattukulam to Muvattupuzha. The nearest points are Pandappilly, Kozhippilly. The village lies 48 km from Ernakulam city and 13 km from Muvattupuzha.

Location

Demographics
 India census, Palakkuzha had a population of 13469 with 6624 males and 6845 females.

References

Villages in Ernakulam district